The Japanese School in Prague (プラハ日本人学校 Puraha Nihonjin Gakkō) is a Japanese international school in Řepy, District 6, Prague, Czech Republic. It is attached affiliated with the Embassy of Japan in Prague.

The school opened on April 28, 1980 (Showa 55), and it had its origins in an educational programme established in 1972. It was previously at Slunna 8.

References

Further reading
 木庭 和雄 (福生市立福生第三小学校). "プラハ日本人学校に赴任して(第6回創価大学教育研究大会報告)" (Archive). 創大教育研究 17, 43–44, 2008–03. Soka University. Alternate location (Archive). See profile at CiNii. See profile at Soka University.
 "プラハ日本人学校 大久保 瑞恵" (Archive). 公益社団法人信濃教育会.

Reports by those affiliated with the school:
Sugino, Masahiko (杉野　雅彦; 前プラハ日本人学校　教頭 高知県教育委員会事務局生涯学習課　課長補佐). "プラハ日本人学校の国際理解教育" (Archive). Tokyo Gakugei University. p. 108–110.
Tanei, Ichirō (種井 一郎; 前プラハ日本人学校　教諭 兵庫県神戸市立塩屋中学校　教諭) "プラハ日本人学校での現地理解と平和学習" (Archive). Tokyo Gakugei University. p. 74–77.

External links

  Japanese School in Prague
  Japanese School in Prague (old website)
   (old website)
   (old website)

Prague
Schools in Prague
International schools in the Czech Republic
Czech Republic–Japan relations
1980 establishments in Czechoslovakia
Educational institutions established in 1980
Czechoslovakia–Japan relations